The Richmond Academy of Medicine (RAM) is Virginia's oldest local medical society. The nonprofit organization boasts a membership of approximately 2,500 physicians and other health care practitioners. The academy serves as a strong advocate for physicians and patients, supports the needs of physicians and their families, and offers a vibrant and informative forum for Central Virginia’s growing medical community.

The Academy traces its beginnings to December 15, 1820, when a group of 17 physicians met at Richmond’s Eagle Hotel. Their purpose was “promotion of medical knowledge” through case studies and scholarly essays focused on topics such as bilious fever, bloodletting, consumption and duties of the physician. The group, which originally called itself the Medical Society of Virginia, elected James McClurg as its first president. McClurg, who received his medical education in Edinburgh, served as Richmond's mayor and was a delegate to the United States Constitutional Convention.

In 1824, the organization was granted a state charter by the Virginia General Assembly, allowing it authority to speak for organized medicine and regulate its practice in the Commonwealth. Though it was chartered as the medical society for the state, it was common knowledge that the group was controlled by Richmond-area physicians. Later in the century, those physicians renamed themselves the Richmond Academy of Medicine, while a new state society was organized under RAM's former name, the Medical Society of Virginia.

RAM was originally founded by white males. The first female member, Emily Chenault Runyon, an 1888 graduate of the Women's Medical College of Chicago, passed the Virginia medical board in 1895, but was not admitted into RAM until 1910. It wasn't until 1964 that RAM voted to strike restrictive language from its bylaws and allow physicians of color to join. To this day, nurse practitioners and physician assistants are allowed to join RAM but cannot hold office nor vote.

For the first century of its existence, RAM held meetings at various venues across the city. But in 1932, Dr. Joseph Lyon Miller, a graduate of Richmond's second medical school, the University College of Medicine, proposed donating his valuable library of medical literature to RAM if it built a permanent home that would house the collection.

RAM rose to the challenge, building is a historic medical library building in Richmond, Virginia. It was built in 1931–32, and is a two-story, five bay square, brick and concrete Georgian Revival style building. The building features an elaborately-designed entry with a large broken pediment and a cartouche bearing a caduceus. The building housed a library, dining room, auditorium and offices. The academy moved from that building in the mid-2000s to rented office space.

Through the decades, RAM members fought for both the medical profession and for their patients. On several occasions, disagreements over medical care turned violent, with at least one duel and one knife fight.

But more often, RAM was discussing the business of medicine, debating the best health care delivery, pushing for oversight of medicine, debating the pros and cons of health insurance, universal health care, advertising in medicine, and various legislative issues.
The academy took the lead and supported major efforts to obtain clean water, pure milk, recreational facilities and even a city library in Richmond. During the influenza pandemic of 1918, RAM members staffed a makeshift hospital in John Marshall High School to care for those with the deadly disease. RAM was largely responsible for creating a community blood bank. Over the years, RAM fostered a close working relationship with the Richmond City Health Department and the Virginia Department of Health.

Throughout its history, the academy has developed ways and means to provide care for the poor, the homeless and the disabled. During the 19th century, many members provided charity care wherever they could or supported the work of other institutions. In the past 50 years, RAM made its mark working to improve care for the underserved, with members serving as the backbone of organizations such as the Fan Free Clinic (now Health Brigade), Crossover Healthcare Ministry and the Richmond AIDS Ministry.

Currently under RAM's umbrella is the Access Now program, which provides specialty care to uninsured patients in Central Virginia. Another RAM program, Honoring Choices Virginia, offers education about making health care decisions and advance care planning support to all Virginians.

RAM also offers a scholarship each year to a student in Virginia Commonwealth University's School of Medicine.

In 2020, the academy was honored by Virginia's General Assembly for its 200 years of service to physicians and patients. During the coronavirus pandemic, RAM's Loving Lunches RVA program delivered 16,500 meals to 27 medical facilities between April and August, pumping more than $100,000 into the local food service economy. The program was revived in 2021.

Medical professional networks